Saint Knut's Day (or ;), or the Feast of Saint Knut, is a traditional festival celebrated in Sweden and Finland on 13January. It is not celebrated on this date in Denmark (the Knut day was moved in Sweden, not in Denmark) despite being named for the Danish prince Canute Lavard, and later also associated with his uncle, Canute the Saint, the patron saint of Denmark. In Sweden, the feast held during this event is called a Knut's party (literally 'Christmas tree plundering').

Origins 
Canute Lavard (Knut Levard in Swedish) was a Danish duke who was assassinated by his cousin and rival Magnus Nilsson on 7January 1131 so that Nilsson could usurp the Danish throne. In the aftermath of his death there was a civil war, which led to Knut being later declared a saint, and 7January became Knut's Day, a name day.

As his name day roughly coincided with Epiphany (the "thirteenth day of Christmas"), Knut's Day and Epiphany were conflated to some degree.

Finland 
On , a tradition has been observed which is somewhat analogous to the modern Santa Claus, where young men dressed as goats would visit houses. Usually the dress was an inverted fur jacket, a leather or birch bark mask, and horns. Unlike Santa Claus,  was a scary character (cf. Krampus). The men dressed as  wandered from house to house, came in, and typically demanded food from the household and especially leftover alcoholic beverages. Unless  received a salary from the host, he committed evil deeds. A dialectical proverb from Noormarkku says:  or 'Good [St.] Thomas brings Christmas, evil Knut takes [it] away.'

In Finland the  tradition is still kept alive in areas of Satakunta, Southwest Finland, Ostrobothnia and very much so on the Åland Islands. However, nowadays the character is usually played by children and now involves a happy encounter.

Sweden 

In Sweden St. Knut's Day marks the end of the Christmas and holiday season. It is celebrated by taking out the Christmas tree and dancing around it. Nowadays, the feast is mainly for children.

References 

January observances
Christmas-linked holidays
Knut
Finnish culture
Swedish culture